Goodheart–Willcox is a book publishing company based in Tinley Park, Illinois, United States. It was founded in 1921, and its current CEO is John Flanagan.

References

External links
Official site

Book publishing companies based in Illinois
Companies based in Will County, Illinois
Publishing companies established in 1921